Lorenzo Ratti (c. 1589–1630) was an Italian baroque composer originating from Perugia. His parents were Girolamo and Isapaola Ugolini. His uncle and teacher was Vincenzo Ugolini. He was the predecessor of Carissimi at the Collegium Germanicum and furthermore he was a teacher of Orazio Benevoli.

Biography 
Obviously born in Perugia in 1589 or 1590 the dates and places of his birth and death are not quite clear. Some sources like François-Joseph Fétis mention a village called Loreto in the surrounding of Naples as his place of birth, but Robert Eitner does not agree and claims Perugia to be Ratti's place of birth. Also an obviously originally in 1632 signed sheet of music makes his dying date seem to be doubtful.

First he was mentioned in 1598/99 as a boy soprano of the ''Cappella Giulia di S. Pietro'' in Rome and later on he is the third organist there. For a short time he was the first organist of the dome of Perugia (1613-1616). Returning to Rome he advanced to be the director of music of several ensembles. His best known employments had been at S. Luigi dei Francesi as the teacher of Orazio Benevoli and that of the director of music at the Collegium Germanicum at S. Loreto. At last he succeeded Antonio Cifra as the director of music at Santa Casa di Loreto.

Works, editions and recordings
He composed lots of sacral works. Very well known are his six Gospel Dialogues for the oratory. He is claimed to have composed 157 motets. Furthermore he created a so-called dramma harmonico:
 Missa Zacharia a 16
 6 Dialogues for the Oratory
 Sacrae modulationes 1628
Il Ciclope overo Della vendetta d’Apolline
Eitner also mentioned several works including their state of conservation and their location (partly translated and shortened):
 Motecta 2, 3, 4 et 5 voc. lib. 1.; Roma 1617  Zanetti., Caecilia  in  Rome complete. B. B: C 1. 2. B.
 Sacrae  Modulationes  nunc  primum in  lucem  editae  Pars  I./II., (not complete), Bologna, Kremsmünster, 1628 Aless. Vincentius
 Litaniae  beatiss.  V.  M.  5,  6,  7,  8  et 12 voc. una c. B. ad org. Ven. 1630 Aless. Vincentius
 Cantica  Salomonis.  Binis, ternis, 4nis, acquinis vocibus concinenda. 1632
 Di  Lorenzo R...  nepote  e discepolo di Vinc. Ugolini. Il 1. lib. de Madrigali a  5  voci, 1615  G.  Vincenti. Neapel.
 Alfieri, Bd.2, S. 65. Jesu cordis solatium 5 voc.
 O Domine Jesu Christe, (2 copies) .
 Cap. lat.: Missa sine nom. a 4 cori (4 Org. u. 4 voci per coro).
 Cap. sistina, Cod. 220, Ecce panis  angelicus 5 voc.
 Kremsmünster, Cod. Lechler "einige Tonsätze" (= "some compositions").
 "In  alten  Samlwk.  im  Druck" (= "collection to be printed"):  In  Dom. Bianchi's  Sacrarum  modulat.  1642:  Transfige. — In Sammaruco's Sacri affetti 1625: Salve virgo sacra parens 4 voc. concert.

Further reading 
 Oratorios of the Italian baroque, I, a cura di H.E. Smither, Laaber 1985, pp. 172–231
Robert Eitner: Biographisch-bibliographisches Quellen-Lexikon der Musiker und Musikgelehrten. Breitkopf & Haertel, Leipzig 1900
F. J. Fétis, Biogr. univ. des musiciens, Paris 1873

References

1589 births
1630 deaths
Year of birth uncertain
17th-century Italian composers
Italian male composers
17th-century male musicians